The Boeing 767 is an American wide-body aircraft developed and manufactured by Boeing Commercial Airplanes.

The aircraft was launched as the 7X7 program on July 14, 1978, the prototype first flew on September 26, 1981, and it was certified on July 30, 1982. The original 767-200 entered service on September 8, 1982, with United Airlines, and the extended-range 767-200ER in 1984.
The 767-300F, a production freighter version, debuted in October 1995. It was stretched again into the 767-400ER from September 2000.

To complement the larger 747, it has a seven-abreast cross-section, accommodating smaller LD2 ULD cargo containers.
The 767 is Boeing's first wide-body twinjet, powered by General Electric CF6, Rolls-Royce RB211, or Pratt & Whitney JT9D turbofans. JT9D engines were eventually replaced by PW4000 engines.
The aircraft has a conventional tail and a supercritical wing for reduced aerodynamic drag.
Its two-crew glass cockpit, a first for a Boeing airliner, was developed jointly for the 757 − a narrow-body aircraft, allowing a common pilot type rating. Studies for a higher-capacity 767 in 1986 led Boeing to develop the larger 777 twinjet, introduced in June 1995.

The  767-200 typically seats 216 passengers over 3,900 nmi (7,200 km), while the 767-200ER seats 181 over a 6,590 nautical mile (12,200 km) range.
The  767-300 typically seats 269 passengers over 3,900 nmi (7,200 km), while the 767-300ER seats 218 over 5,980 nmi (11,070 km).
The 767-300F can haul  over 3,225 nmi (6,025 km), and the  767-400ER typically seats 245 passengers over 5,625 nmi (10,415 km). Military derivatives include the E-767 for surveillance and the KC-767 and KC-46 aerial tankers.

Initially marketed for transcontinental routes, a loosening of ETOPS rules starting in 1985 allowed the aircraft to operate transatlantic flights.
A total of 742 of these aircraft were in service in July 2018, with Delta Air Lines being the largest operator with 77 aircraft in its fleet.

, Boeing has received 1,373 orders from 74 customers, of which 1,271 airplanes have been delivered, while the remaining orders are for cargo or tanker variants. Competitors have included the Airbus A300, A310, and A330-200. Its successor, the 787 Dreamliner, entered service in 2011.

Development

Background
In 1970, the 747 entered service as the first wide-body jetliner with a fuselage wide enough to feature a twin-aisle cabin. Two years later, the manufacturer began a development study, code-named 7X7, for a new wide-body jetliner intended to replace the 707 and other early generation narrow-body airliners. The aircraft would also provide twin-aisle seating, but in a smaller fuselage than the existing 747, McDonnell Douglas DC-10, and Lockheed L-1011 TriStar wide-bodies. To defray the high cost of development, Boeing signed risk-sharing agreements with Italian corporation Aeritalia and the Civil Transport Development Corporation (CTDC), a consortium of Japanese aerospace companies. This marked the manufacturer's first major international joint venture, and both Aeritalia and the CTDC received supply contracts in return for their early participation. The initial 7X7 was conceived as a short take-off and landing airliner intended for short-distance flights, but customers were unenthusiastic about the concept, leading to its redefinition as a mid-size, transcontinental-range airliner. At this stage the proposed aircraft featured two or three engines, with possible configurations including over-wing engines and a T-tail.

By 1976, a twinjet layout, similar to the one which had debuted on the Airbus A300, became the baseline configuration. The decision to use two engines reflected increased industry confidence in the reliability and economics of new-generation jet powerplants. While airline requirements for new wide-body aircraft remained ambiguous, the 7X7 was generally focused on mid-size, high-density markets. As such, it was intended to transport large numbers of passengers between major cities. Advancements in civil aerospace technology, including high-bypass-ratio turbofan engines, new flight deck systems, aerodynamic improvements, and more efficient lightweight designs were to be applied to the 7X7. Many of these features were also included in a parallel development effort for a new mid-size narrow-body airliner, code-named 7N7, which would become the 757. Work on both proposals proceeded through the airline industry upturn in the late 1970s.

In January 1978, Boeing announced a major extension of its Everett factory—which was then dedicated to manufacturing the 747—to accommodate its new wide-body family. The 767MR/LR was subsequently renamed 777 for differentiation purposes. The 767 was officially launched on July 14, 1978, when United Airlines ordered 30 of the 767-200 variant, followed by 50 more 767-200 orders from American Airlines and Delta Air Lines later that year. The 767-100 was ultimately not offered for sale, as its capacity was too close to the 757's seating, while the 777 trijet was eventually dropped in favor of standardizing the twinjet configuration.

Design effort
In the late 1970s, operating cost replaced capacity as the primary factor in airliner purchases. As a result, the 767's design process emphasized fuel efficiency from the outset. Boeing targeted a 20 to 30 percent cost saving over earlier aircraft, mainly through new engine and wing technology. As development progressed, engineers used computer-aided design for over a third of the 767's design drawings, and performed 26,000 hours of wind tunnel tests. Design work occurred concurrently with the 757 twinjet, leading Boeing to treat both as almost one program to reduce risk and cost. Both aircraft would ultimately receive shared design features, including avionics, flight management systems, instruments, and handling characteristics. Combined development costs were estimated at $3.5 to $4 billion.

Early 767 customers were given the choice of Pratt & Whitney JT9D or General Electric CF6 turbofans, marking the first time that Boeing had offered more than one engine option at the launch of a new airliner. The engines were mounted approximately one-third the length of the wing from the fuselage, similar to previous wide-body trijets. The larger wings were designed using an aft-loaded shape which reduced aerodynamic drag and distributed lift more evenly across their surface span than any of the manufacturer's previous aircraft. The wings provided higher-altitude cruise performance, added fuel capacity, and expansion room for future stretched variants.

While it was narrower than previous wide-body designs, seven abreast seating with two aisles could be fitted, and the reduced width produced less aerodynamic drag. The fuselage was not wide enough to accommodate two standard LD3 wide-body unit load devices side-by-side, so a smaller container, the LD2, was created specifically for the 767. Using a conventional tail design also allowed the rear fuselage to be tapered over a shorter section, providing for parallel aisles along the full length of the passenger cabin, and eliminating irregular seat rows toward the rear of the aircraft.

The 767 was the first Boeing wide-body to be designed with a two-crew digital glass cockpit. Cathode ray tube (CRT) color displays and new electronics replaced the role of the flight engineer by enabling the pilot and co-pilot to monitor aircraft systems directly. Despite the promise of reduced crew costs, United Airlines initially demanded a conventional three-person cockpit, citing concerns about the risks associated with introducing a new aircraft. The carrier maintained this position until July 1981, when a US presidential task force determined that a crew of two was safe for operating wide-body jets. A three-crew cockpit remained as an option and was fitted to the first production models. Ansett Australia ordered 767s with three-crew cockpits due to union demands; it was the only airline to operate 767s so configured. The 767's two-crew cockpit was also applied to the 757, allowing pilots to operate both aircraft after a short conversion course, and adding incentive for airlines to purchase both types.

Production and testing
To produce the 767, Boeing formed a network of subcontractors which included domestic suppliers and international contributions from Italy's Aeritalia and Japan's CTDC. The wings and cabin floor were produced in-house, while Aeritalia provided control surfaces, Boeing Vertol made the leading edge for the wings, and Boeing Wichita produced the forward fuselage. The CTDC provided multiple assemblies through its constituent companies, namely Fuji Heavy Industries (wing fairings and gear doors), Kawasaki Heavy Industries (center fuselage), and Mitsubishi Heavy Industries (rear fuselage, doors, and tail). Components were integrated during final assembly at the Everett factory. For expedited production of wing spars, the main structural member of aircraft wings, the Everett factory received robotic machinery to automate the process of drilling holes and inserting fasteners. This method of wing construction expanded on techniques developed for the 747. Final assembly of the first aircraft began in July 1979.

The prototype aircraft, registered N767BA and equipped with JT9D turbofans, rolled out on August 4, 1981. By this time, the 767 program had accumulated 173 firm orders from 17 customers, including Air Canada, All Nippon Airways, Britannia Airways, Transbrasil, and Trans World Airlines (TWA). On September 26, 1981, the prototype took its maiden flight under the command of company test pilots Tommy Edmonds, Lew Wallick, and John Brit. The maiden flight was largely uneventful, save for the inability to retract the landing gear because of a hydraulic fluid leak. The prototype was used for subsequent flight tests.

The 10-month 767 flight test program utilized the first six aircraft built. The first four aircraft were equipped with JT9D engines, while the fifth and sixth were fitted with CF6 engines. The test fleet was largely used to evaluate avionics, flight systems, handling, and performance, while the sixth aircraft was used for route-proving flights. During testing, pilots described the 767 as generally easy to fly, with its maneuverability unencumbered by the bulkiness associated with larger wide-body jets. Following 1,600 hours of flight tests, the JT9D-powered 767-200 received certification from the US Federal Aviation Administration (FAA) and the UK Civil Aviation Authority (CAA) in July 1982. The first delivery occurred on August 19, 1982, to United Airlines. The CF6-powered 767-200 received certification in September 1982, followed by the first delivery to Delta Air Lines on October 25, 1982.

Entry into service

The 767 entered service with United Airlines on September 8, 1982. The aircraft's first commercial flight used a JT9D-powered  on the Chicago-to-Denver route. The CF6-powered 767-200 commenced service three months later with Delta Air Lines. Upon delivery, early 767s were mainly deployed on domestic routes, including US transcontinental services. American Airlines and TWA began flying the 767-200 in late 1982, while Air Canada, China Airlines, El Al, and Pacific Western began operating the aircraft in 1983. The aircraft's introduction was relatively smooth, with few operational glitches and greater dispatch reliability than prior jetliners.

Stretched derivatives
Forecasting airline interest in larger-capacity models, Boeing announced the stretched  in 1983 and the extended-range 767-300ER in 1984. Japan Airlines placed the first order for the -300 in September 1983. Following its first flight on January 30, 1986, the type entered service with Japan Airlines on October 20, 1986. The 767-300ER completed its first flight on December 9, 1986, but it was not until March 1987 that the first firm order, from American Airlines, was placed. The type entered service with American Airlines on March 3, 1988. The 767-300 and 767-300ER gained popularity after entering service, and came to account for approximately two-thirds of all 767s sold.

After the debut of the first stretched 767s, Boeing sought to address airline requests for greater capacity by proposing larger models, including a partial double-deck version informally named the "Hunchback of Mukilteo" (from a town near Boeing's Everett factory) with a 757 body section mounted over the aft main fuselage. In 1986, Boeing proposed the 767-X, a revised model with extended wings and a wider cabin, but received little interest. By 1988, the 767-X had evolved into an all-new twinjet, which revived the 777 designation. Until the 777's 1995 debut, the 767-300 and 767-300ER remained Boeing's second-largest wide-bodies behind the 747.

Buoyed by a recovering global economy and ETOPS approval, 767 sales accelerated in the mid-to-late 1980s; 1989 was the most prolific year with 132 firm orders. By the early 1990s, the wide-body twinjet had become its manufacturer's annual best-selling aircraft, despite a slight decrease due to economic recession. During this period, the 767 became the most common airliner for transatlantic flights between North America and Europe. By the end of the decade, 767s crossed the Atlantic more frequently than all other aircraft types combined. The 767 also propelled the growth of point-to-point flights which bypassed major airline hubs in favor of direct routes. Taking advantage of the aircraft's lower operating costs and smaller capacity, operators added non-stop flights to secondary population centers, thereby eliminating the need for connecting flights. The increased number of cities receiving non-stop services caused a paradigm shift in the airline industry as point-to-point travel gained prominence at the expense of the traditional hub-and-spoke model.

Six months later, the carrier temporarily grounded its entire 767 fleet after discovering cracks in the engine pylons of several aircraft. The cracks were related to the extra weight of the RB211 engines, which are  heavier than other 767 engines. During the grounding, interim repairs were conducted to alleviate stress on engine pylon components, and a parts redesign in 1991 prevented further cracks. Boeing also performed a structural reassessment, resulting in production changes and modifications to the engine pylons of all 767s in service.

In January 1993, following an order from UPS Airlines, Boeing launched a freighter variant, the 767-300F, which entered service with UPS on October 16, 1995. The 767-300F featured a main deck cargo hold, upgraded landing gear, and strengthened wing structure. The first two , featuring extensive modifications to accommodate surveillance radar and other monitoring equipment, were delivered in 1998 to the Japan Self-Defense Forces.

In November 1995, after abandoning development of a smaller version of the 777, Boeing announced that it was revisiting studies for a larger 767. The variant was specifically aimed at Delta Air Lines' pending replacement of its aging Lockheed L-1011 TriStars, and faced competition from the A330-200, a shortened derivative of the Airbus A330. In March 1997, Delta Air Lines launched the 767-400ER when it ordered the type to replace its L-1011 fleet. In October 1997, Continental Airlines also ordered the 767-400ER to replace its McDonnell Douglas DC-10 fleet. The type completed its first flight on October 9, 1999, and entered service with Continental Airlines on September 14, 2000.

Dreamliner introduction

In the early 2000s, cumulative 767 deliveries approached 900, but new sales declined during an airline industry downturn. In 2001, Boeing dropped plans for a longer-range model, the 767-400ERX, in favor of the proposed Sonic Cruiser, a new jetliner which aimed to fly 15 percent faster while having comparable fuel costs to the 767. The following year, Boeing announced the KC-767 Tanker Transport, a second military derivative of the 767-200ER. Launched with an order in October 2002 from the Italian Air Force, the KC-767 was intended for the dual role of refueling other aircraft and carrying cargo. The Japanese government became the second customer for the type in March 2003. In May 2003, the United States Air Force (USAF) announced its intent to lease KC-767s to replace its aging KC-135 tankers. The plan was suspended in March 2004 amid a conflict of interest scandal, resulting in multiple US government investigations and the departure of several Boeing officials, including Philip Condit, the company's chief executive officer, and chief financial officer Michael Sears. The first KC-767s were delivered in 2008 to the Japan Self-Defense Forces.

In late 2002, after airlines expressed reservations about its emphasis on speed over cost reduction, Boeing halted development of the Sonic Cruiser. The following year, the manufacturer announced the 7E7, a mid-size 767 successor made from composite materials which promised to be 20 percent more fuel efficient. The new jetliner was the first stage of a replacement aircraft initiative called the Boeing Yellowstone Project. Customers embraced the 7E7, later renamed 787 Dreamliner, and within two years it had become the fastest-selling airliner in the company's history. In 2005, Boeing opted to continue 767 production despite record Dreamliner sales, citing a need to provide customers waiting for the 787 with a more readily available option. Subsequently, the 767-300ER was offered to customers affected by 787 delays, including All Nippon Airways and Japan Airlines. Some aging 767s, exceeding 20 years in age, were also kept in service past planned retirement dates due to the delays. To extend the operational lives of older aircraft, airlines increased heavy maintenance procedures, including D-check teardowns and inspections for corrosion, a recurring issue on aging 767s. The first 787s entered service with All Nippon Airways in October 2011, 42 months behind schedule.

Continued production 

In 2007, the 767 received a production boost when UPS and DHL Aviation placed a combined 33 orders for the 767-300F. Renewed freighter interest led Boeing to consider enhanced versions of the 767-200 and 767-300F with increased gross weights, 767-400ER wing extensions, and 777 avionics. Net orders for the 767 declined from 24 in 2008 to just three in 2010. During the same period, operators upgraded aircraft already in service; in 2008, the first 767-300ER retrofitted with blended winglets from Aviation Partners Incorporated debuted with American Airlines. Other carriers including All Nippon Airways and Delta Air Lines also ordered winglet kits.

On February 2, 2011, the 1,000th 767 rolled out, destined for All Nippon Airways. The aircraft was the 91st 767-300ER ordered by the Japanese carrier, and with its completion the 767 became the second wide-body airliner to reach the thousand-unit milestone after the 747. The 1,000th aircraft also marked the last model produced on the original 767 assembly line. Beginning with the 1,001st aircraft, production moved to another area in the Everett factory which occupied about half of the previous floor space. The new assembly line made room for 787 production and aimed to boost manufacturing efficiency by over twenty percent.

At the inauguration of its new assembly line, the 767's order backlog numbered approximately 50, only enough for production to last until 2013. Despite the reduced backlog, Boeing officials expressed optimism that additional orders would be forthcoming. On February 24, 2011, the USAF announced its selection of the KC-767 Advanced Tanker, an upgraded variant of the KC-767, for its KC-X fleet renewal program. The selection followed two rounds of tanker competition between Boeing and Airbus parent EADS, and came eight years after the USAF's original 2003 announcement of its plan to lease KC-767s. The tanker order encompassed 179 aircraft and was expected to sustain 767 production past 2013.

In December 2011, FedEx Express announced a 767-300F order for 27 aircraft to replace its DC-10 freighters, citing the USAF tanker order and Boeing's decision to continue production as contributing factors. FedEx Express agreed to buy 19 more of the −300F variant in June 2012. In June 2015, FedEx said it was accelerating retirements of planes both to reflect demand and to modernize its fleet, recording charges of $276 million. On July 21, 2015, FedEx announced an order for 50 767-300F with options on another 50, the largest order for the type. With the announcement FedEx confirmed that it has firm orders for 106 of the freighters for delivery between 2018 and 2023. In February 2018, UPS announced an order for 4 more 767-300Fs to increase the total on order to 63.

With its successor, the Boeing New Midsize Airplane, that was planned for introduction in 2025 or later, and the 787 being much larger, Boeing could restart a passenger 767-300ER production to bridge the gap. A demand for 50 to 60 aircraft could have to be satisfied. Having to replace its 40 767s, United Airlines requested a price quote for other widebodies. In November 2017, Boeing CEO Dennis Muilenburg cited interest beyond military and freighter uses. However, in early 2018 Boeing Commercial Airplanes VP of marketing Randy Tinseth stated that the company did not intend to resume production of the passenger variant.

In its first quarter of 2018 earnings report, Boeing plan to increase its production from 2.5 to 3 monthly beginning in January 2020 due to increased demand in the cargo market, as FedEx had 56 on order, UPS has four, and an unidentified customer has three on order. This rate could rise to 3.5 per month in July 2020 and 4 per month in January 2021, before decreasing to 3 per month in January 2025 and then 2 per month in July 2025.
In 2019, unit cost was US$217.9 million for a -300ER, and US$220.3 million for a -300F.

Re-engined 767-XF 
In October 2019, Boeing was reportedly studying a re-engined 767-XF for entry into service around 2025, based on the 767-400ER with an extended landing gear to accommodate larger General Electric GEnx turbofan engines.
The cargo market is the main target, but a passenger version could be a cheaper alternative to the proposed New Midsize Airplane.

Design

Overview
The 767 is a low-wing cantilever monoplane with a conventional tail unit featuring a single fin and rudder. The wings are swept at 31.5 degrees and optimized for a cruising speed of Mach 0.8. Each wing features a supercritical airfoil cross-section and is equipped with six-panel leading edge slats, single- and double-slotted flaps, inboard and outboard ailerons, and six spoilers. The airframe further incorporates Carbon-fiber-reinforced polymer composite material wing surfaces, Kevlar fairings and access panels, plus improved aluminum alloys, which together reduce overall weight by  versus preceding aircraft.

To distribute the aircraft's weight on the ground, the 767 has a retractable tricycle landing gear with four wheels on each main gear and two for the nose gear. The original wing and gear design accommodated the stretched 767-300 without major changes. The 767-400ER features a larger, more widely spaced main gear with 777 wheels, tires, and brakes. To prevent damage if the tail section contacts the runway surface during takeoff, 767-300 and 767-400ER models are fitted with a retractable tailskid.

All passenger 767 models have exit doors near the front and rear of the aircraft. Most 767-200 and -200ER models have one overwing exit door for emergency use; an optional second overwing exit increases maximum allowable capacity from 255 to 290.  The 767-300 and -300ER typically feature two overwing exit doors or, in a configuration with no overwing exits, three exit doors on each side and a smaller exit door aft of the wing.  A further configuration featuring three exit doors on each side plus one overwing exit allows an increase in maximum capacity from 290 to 351.  All 767-400ERs are configured with three exit doors on each side and a smaller exit door aft of the wing. The 767-300F has one exit door at the forward left-hand side of the aircraft.

In addition to shared avionics and computer technology, the 767 uses the same auxiliary power unit, electric power systems, and hydraulic parts as the 757. A raised cockpit floor and the same forward cockpit windows result in similar pilot viewing angles. Related design and functionality allows 767 pilots to obtain a common type rating to operate the 757 and share the same seniority roster with pilots of either aircraft.

Flight systems

The original 767 flight deck uses six Rockwell Collins CRT screens to display Electronic flight instrument system (EFIS) and engine indication and crew alerting system (EICAS) information, allowing pilots to handle monitoring tasks previously performed by the flight engineer. The CRTs replace conventional electromechanical instruments found on earlier aircraft. An enhanced flight management system, improved over versions used on early 747s, automates navigation and other functions, while an automatic landing system facilitates CAT IIIb instrument landings in low visibility situations. The 767 became the first aircraft to receive CAT IIIb certification from the FAA for landings with  minimum visibility in 1984. On the 767-400ER, the cockpit layout is simplified further with six Rockwell Collins liquid crystal display (LCD) screens, and adapted for similarities with the 777 and the Next Generation 737. To retain operational commonality, the LCD screens can be programmed to display information in the same manner as earlier 767s. In 2012, Boeing and Rockwell Collins launched a further 787-based cockpit upgrade for the 767, featuring three landscape-format LCD screens that can display two windows each.

The 767 is equipped with three redundant hydraulic systems for operation of control surfaces, landing gear, and utility actuation systems. Each engine powers a separate hydraulic system, and the third system uses electric pumps. A ram air turbine provides power for basic controls in the event of an emergency. An early form of fly-by-wire is employed for spoiler operation, utilizing electric signaling instead of traditional control cables. The fly-by-wire system reduces weight and allows independent operation of individual spoilers.

Interior

The 767 features a twin-aisle cabin with a typical configuration of six abreast in business class and seven across in economy. The standard seven abreast, 2–3–2 economy class layout places approximately 87 percent of all seats at a window or aisle. As a result, the aircraft can be largely occupied before center seats need to be filled, and each passenger is no more than one seat from the aisle. It is possible to configure the aircraft with extra seats for up to an eight abreast configuration, but this is less common.

The 767 interior introduced larger overhead bins and more lavatories per passenger than previous aircraft. The bins are wider to accommodate garment bags without folding, and strengthened for heavier carry-on items. A single, large galley is installed near the aft doors, allowing for more efficient meal service and simpler ground resupply. Passenger and service doors are an overhead plug type, which retract upwards, and commonly used doors can be equipped with an electric-assist system.

In 2000, a 777-style interior, known as the Boeing Signature Interior, debuted on the 767-400ER. Subsequently, adopted for all new-build 767s, the Signature Interior features even larger overhead bins, indirect lighting, and sculpted, curved panels. The 767-400ER also received larger windows derived from the 777. Older 767s can be retrofitted with the Signature Interior. Some operators have adopted a simpler modification known as the Enhanced Interior, featuring curved ceiling panels and indirect lighting with minimal modification of cabin architecture, as well as aftermarket modifications such as the NuLook 767 package by Heath Tecna.

Operational history

In its first year, the 767 logged a 96.1 percent dispatch rate, which exceeded the industry average for all-new aircraft. Operators reported generally favorable ratings for the twinjet's sound levels, interior comfort, and economic performance. Resolved issues were minor and included the recalibration of a leading edge sensor to prevent false readings, the replacement of an evacuation slide latch, and the repair of a tailplane pivot to match production specifications.

Seeking to capitalize on its new wide-body's potential for growth, Boeing offered an extended-range model, the 767-200ER, in its first year of service. Ethiopian Airlines placed the first order for the type in December 1982. The 767-200ER entered service with El Al Airline on March 27, 1984. The type was mainly ordered by international airlines operating medium-traffic, long-distance flights.

In the mid-1980s, the 767 spearheaded the growth of twinjet flights across the northern Atlantic under extended-range twin-engine operational performance standards (ETOPS) regulations, the FAA's safety rules governing transoceanic flights by aircraft with two engines. Before the 767, overwater flight paths of twinjets could be no more than 90 minutes away from diversion airports. In May 1985, the FAA granted its first approval for 120-minute ETOPS flights to 767 operators, on an individual airline basis starting with TWA, provided that the operator met flight safety criteria. This allowed the aircraft to fly overseas routes at up to two hours' distance from land. The larger safety margins were permitted because of the improved reliability demonstrated by the twinjet and its turbofan engines. The FAA lengthened the ETOPS time to 180 minutes for CF6-powered 767s in 1989, making the type the first to be certified under the longer duration, and all available engines received approval by 1993. Regulatory approval spurred the expansion of transoceanic 767 flights and boosted the aircraft's sales.

Variants

The 767 has been produced in three fuselage lengths. Longer-range variants include the 767-200ER and 767-300ER, while cargo models include the 767-300F, a production freighter, and conversions of passenger 767-200 and 767-300 models.

When referring to different variants, Boeing and airlines often collapse the model number (767) and the variant designator, e.g. –200 or –300, into a truncated form, e.g. "762" or "763". Subsequent to the capacity number, designations may append the range identifier, though -200ER and -300ER are company marketing designations and not certificated as such. The International Civil Aviation Organization (ICAO) aircraft type designator system uses a similar numbering scheme, but adds a preceding manufacturer letter; all variants based on the 767-200 and 767-300 are classified under the codes "B762" and "B763"; the 767-400ER receives the designation of "B764".

767-200

The 767-200 was the original model and entered service with United Airlines in 1982. The type has been used primarily by mainline U.S. carriers for domestic routes between major hub centers such as Los Angeles to Washington. The 767-200 was the first aircraft to be used on transatlantic ETOPS flights, beginning with TWA on February 1, 1985, under 90-minute diversion rules. Deliveries for the variant totaled 128 aircraft. There were 52 examples of the model in commercial service , almost entirely as freighter conversions. The type's competitors included the Airbus A300 and A310.

The 767-200 was produced until 1987 when production switched to the extended-range 767-200ER. Some early 767-200s were subsequently upgraded to extended-range specification. In 1998, Boeing began offering 767-200 conversions to 767-200SF (Special Freighter) specification for cargo use, and Israel Aerospace Industries has been licensed to perform cargo conversions since 2005. The conversion process entails the installation of a side cargo door, strengthened main deck floor, and added freight monitoring and safety equipment. The 767-200SF was positioned as a replacement for Douglas DC-8 freighters.

767-2C
A commercial freighter version of the Boeing  with wings from the -300 series and an updated flightdeck was first flown on 29 December 2014. A military tanker variant of the Boeing 767-2C is being developed for the USAF as the KC-46. Boeing is building two aircraft as commercial freighters which will be used to obtain Federal Aviation Administration certification, a further two Boeing 767-2Cs will be modified as military tankers. , Boeing does not have customers for the freighter.

767-200ER

The 767-200ER was the first extended-range model and entered service with El Al in 1984. The additional fuel capacity is accomplished by using the center tank's dry dock to carry fuel. The non-ER variant's center tank is what is called cheek tanks; two interconnected halves in each wing root with a dry dock in between. The center tank is also used on the -300ER and -400ER variants.

The 767-200ER was the first 767 to complete a non-stop transatlantic journey, and broke the flying distance record for a twinjet airliner on April 17, 1988, with an Air Mauritius flight from Halifax, Nova Scotia to Port Louis, Mauritius, covering . The 767-200ER has been acquired by international operators seeking smaller wide-body aircraft for long-haul routes such as New York to Beijing. Deliveries of the type totaled 121 with no unfilled orders. As of July 2018, 21 examples of passenger and freighter conversion versions were in airline service. The type's main competitors of the time included the Airbus A300-600R and the A310-300.

767-300

The , the first stretched version of the aircraft, entered service with Japan Airlines in 1986. An optional mid-cabin exit door is positioned ahead of the wings on the left, while more powerful Pratt & Whitney PW4000 and Rolls-Royce RB211 engines later became available. The 767-300's increased capacity has been used on high-density routes within Asia and Europe. The 767-300 was produced from 1986 until 2000. Deliveries for the type totaled 104 aircraft with no unfilled orders remaining. As of July 2018, 34 of the variant were in airline service. The type's main competitor was the Airbus A300.

767-300ER

Power is provided by Pratt & Whitney PW4000, General Electric CF6, or Rolls-Royce RB211 engines. The 767-300ER comes in three exit configurations: the baseline configuration has four main cabin doors and four over-wing window exits, the second configuration has six main cabin doors and two over-wing window exits; and the third configuration has six main cabin doors, as well as two smaller doors that are located behind the wings. Typical routes for the type include Los Angeles to Frankfurt.

The combination of increased capacity and range for the -300ER has been particularly attractive to both new and existing 767 operators. It is the most successful 767 version, with more orders placed than all other variants combined. , 767-300ER deliveries stand at 583 with no unfilled orders. There were 376 examples in service . The type's main competitor is the Airbus A330-200. At its 1990s peak, a new 767-300ER was valued at $85 million, dipping to around $12 million in 2018 for a 1996 build.

767-300F

The 767-300F, the production freighter version of the 767-300ER, entered service with UPS Airlines in 1995. The freighter has a main deck cargo door and crew exit, while the lower deck features two starboard-side cargo doors and one port-side cargo door. A general market version with onboard freight-handling systems, refrigeration capability, and crew facilities was delivered to Asiana Airlines on August 23, 1996. , 767-300F deliveries stand at 161 with 61 unfilled orders. Airlines operated 222 examples of the freighter variant and freighter conversions in July 2018.

In June 2008, All Nippon Airways took delivery of the first 767-300BCF (Boeing Converted Freighter), a modified passenger-to-freighter model. The conversion work was performed in Singapore by ST Aerospace Services, the first supplier to offer a 767-300BCF program, and involved the addition of a main deck cargo door, strengthened main deck floor, and additional freight monitoring and safety equipment. Since then, Boeing, Israel Aerospace Industries, and Wagner Aeronautical have also offered passenger-to-freighter conversion programs for  series aircraft.

767-400ER

The 767-400ER, the first Boeing wide-body jet resulting from two fuselage stretches, entered service with Continental Airlines in 2000. The wingspan is also increased by  through the addition of raked wingtips. The exit configuration uses six main cabin doors and two smaller exit doors behind the wings, similar to certain 767-300ERs. Other differences include an updated cockpit, redesigned landing gear, and 777-style Signature Interior. Power is provided by uprated General Electric CF6 engines.

The FAA granted approval for the 767-400ER to operate 180-minute ETOPS flights before it entered service. No 767-400 (non-extended range) version was developed.

The longer-range 767-400ERX was offered in July 2000 before being cancelled a year later, leaving the 767-400ER as the sole version of the largest 767. Boeing dropped the 767-400ER and the -200ER from its pricing list in 2014.

A total of 37 767-400ERs were delivered to the variant's two airline customers, Continental Airlines (now merged with United Airlines) and Delta Air Lines, with no unfilled orders. All 37 examples of the -400ER were in service in July 2018. One additional example was produced as a military testbed, and later sold as a VIP transport. The type's closest competitor is the Airbus A330-200.

Military and government
Versions of the 767 serve in a number of military and government applications, with responsibilities ranging from airborne surveillance and refueling to cargo and VIP transport. Several military 767s have been derived from the 767-200ER, the longest-range version of the aircraft.
 Airborne Surveillance Testbed – the Airborne Optical Adjunct (AOA) was modified from the prototype 767-200 for a United States Army program, under a contract signed with the Strategic Air Command in July 1984. Intended to evaluate the feasibility of using airborne optical sensors to detect and track hostile intercontinental ballistic missiles, the modified aircraft first flew on August 21, 1987. Alterations included a large "cupola" or hump on the top of the aircraft from above the cockpit to just behind the trailing edge of the wings, and a pair of ventral fins below the rear fuselage. Inside the cupola was a suite of infrared seekers used for tracking theater ballistic missile launches. The aircraft was later renamed as the Airborne Surveillance Testbed (AST). Following the end of the AST program in 2002, the aircraft was retired for scrapping.

 E-767 – the Airborne Early Warning and Control (AWACS) platform for the Japan Self-Defense Forces; it is essentially the Boeing E-3 Sentry mission package on a 767-200ER platform. E-767 modifications, completed on 767-200ERs flown from the Everett factory to Boeing Integrated Defense Systems in Wichita, Kansas, include strengthening to accommodate a dorsal surveillance radar system, engine nacelle alterations, as well as electrical and interior changes. Japan operates four E-767s. The first E-767s were delivered in March 1998.

 KC-767 Tanker Transport – the 767-200ER-based aerial refueling platform operated by the Italian Air Force (Aeronautica Militare), and the Japan Self-Defense Forces. Modifications conducted by Boeing Integrated Defense Systems include the addition of a fly-by-wire refueling boom, strengthened flaps, and optional auxiliary fuel tanks, as well as structural reinforcement and modified avionics. The four KC-767Js ordered by Japan have been delivered. The Aeronautica Militare received the first of its four KC-767As in January 2011.
 KC-767 Advanced Tanker – the 767-200ER-based aerial tanker developed for the USAF KC-X tanker competition. It is an updated version of the KC-767, originally selected as the USAF's new tanker aircraft in 2003, designated KC-767A, and then dropped amid conflict of interest allegations. The KC-767 Advanced Tanker is derived from studies for a longer-range cargo version of the 767-200ER, and features a fly-by-wire refueling boom, a remote vision refueling system, and a 767-400ER-based flight deck with LCD screens and head-up displays.
 KC-46 - a 767-based tanker, not derived from the KC-767, awarded as part of the KC-X contract for the USAF.
 Tanker conversions – the 767 MMTT or Multi-Mission Tanker Transport is a 767-200ER-based aircraft operated by the Colombian Air Force (Fuerza Aérea Colombiana) and modified by Israel Aerospace Industries. In 2013, the Brazilian Air Force ordered two 767-300ER tanker conversions from IAI for its KC-X2 program.
 E-10 MC2A - the Northrop Grumman E-10 was to be a 767-400ER-based replacement for the USAF's 707-based E-3 Sentry AWACS, Northrop Grumman E-8 Joint STARS, and RC-135 SIGINT aircraft. The E-10 would have included an all-new AWACS system, with a powerful active electronically scanned array (AESA) that was also capable of jamming enemy aircraft or missiles. One 767-400ER aircraft was built as a testbed for systems integration, but the program was terminated in January 2009 and the prototype was later sold to Bahrain as a VIP transport.

Undeveloped variants

767-X

In 1986, Boeing announced plans for a partial double-deck Boeing 767 design. The aircraft would have combined the Boeing  with a Boeing 757 cross section mounted over the rear fuselage. The Boeing 767-X would have also featured extended wings and a wider cabin. The 767-X did not get enough interest from airlines to launch and the model was shelved in 1988 in favor of the Boeing 777.

767-400ERX
In March 2000, Boeing was to launch the 259-seat 767-400ERX with an initial order for three from Kenya Airways with deliveries planned for 2004, as it was proposed to Lauda Air.
Rolls-Royce offered its  Trent 600 for the 767-400ERX and the Boeing 747X.

Offered in July, the longer-range -400ERX would have a strengthened wing, fuselage and landing gear for a 15,000 lb (6.8 t) higher MTOW, up to 465,000 lb (210.92 t).
Range would increase by 525 nmi (950 km) to 6,150 nmi (11,390 km), with an additional fuel tank of 2,145 gallons (8,120 L) in the horizontal tail.
The 767-400ERX would offer the capacity of the Airbus A330-200 with 3% lower fuel burn and costs.
Boeing cancelled the variant development in 2001.
Kenya Airways then switched its order to the 777-200ER.

Operators

	
In July 2018, 742 aircraft were in airline service: 73 -200s, 632 -300, and 37 -400ER with 65 -300F on order; the largest operators are Delta Air Lines (77), FedEx (60; largest cargo operator), UPS Airlines (59), United Airlines, Japan Airlines (35), All Nippon Airways (34). The type's competitors included the Airbus A300 and A310.

The largest 767 customers by orders have been FedEx Express 150, Delta Air Lines with (117), All Nippon Airways (96), American Airlines (88), and United Airlines (82). Delta and United are the only customers of all -200, -300, and -400ER passenger variants. In July 2015, FedEx placed a firm order for 50 Boeing 767 freighters with deliveries from 2018 to 2023.

Orders and deliveries

Boeing 767 orders and deliveries (cumulative, by year): 

 
 Data .

Model summary

 Data .

Accidents and incidents

, the Boeing 767 has been in 60 aviation occurrences, including 19 hull-loss accidents. Seven fatal crashes, including three hijackings, have resulted in a total of 854 occupant fatalities.

Fatal accidents

The airliner's first fatal crash, Lauda Air Flight 004, occurred near Bangkok on May 26, 1991, following the in-flight deployment of the left engine thrust reverser on a 767-300ER; none of the 223 aboard survived; as a result of this accident all 767 thrust reversers were deactivated until a redesign was implemented. Investigators determined that an electronically controlled valve, common to late-model Boeing aircraft, was to blame. A new locking device was installed on all affected jetliners, including 767s.

On October 31, 1999, EgyptAir Flight 990, a 767-300ER, crashed off Nantucket, Massachusetts, in international waters killing all 217 people on board. The United States National Transportation Safety Board (NTSB) concluded "not determined", but determined the probable cause to be a deliberate action by the first officer; Egypt disputed this conclusion.

On April 15, 2002, Air China Flight 129, a 767-200ER, crashed into a hill amid inclement weather while trying to land at Gimhae International Airport in Busan, South Korea. The crash resulted in the death of 129 of the 166 people on board, and the cause was attributed to pilot error.

On February 23, 2019, Atlas Air Flight 3591, a Boeing 767-300ERF air freighter operating for Amazon Air, crashed into Trinity Bay near Houston, Texas, while on descent into George Bush Intercontinental Airport; both pilots and the single passenger were killed. The cause was attributed to pilot error and spatial disorientation.

Hijackings

The 767 has been involved in six hijackings, three resulting in loss of life, for a combined total of 282 occupant fatalities. On November 23, 1996, Ethiopian Airlines Flight 961, a 767-200ER, was hijacked and crash-landed in the Indian Ocean near the Comoro Islands after running out of fuel, killing 125 out of the 175 persons on board; this was a rare example of occupants surviving a land-based aircraft ditching on water. Two 767s were involved in the September 11 attacks on the World Trade Center in 2001, resulting in the collapse of its two main towers. In addition, more than 2,600 people were killed in the towers or on the ground. A foiled 2001 shoe bomb attempt that December involved an American Airlines 767-300ER.

Hull losses
On November 1, 2011, LOT Polish Airlines Flight 16, a 767-300ER, safely landed at Warsaw Chopin Airport in Warsaw, Poland after a mechanical failure of the landing gear forced an emergency landing with the landing gear retracted. There were no injuries, but the aircraft involved was damaged and subsequently written off. At the time of the incident, aviation analysts speculated that it may have been the first instance of a complete landing gear failure in the 767's service history. Subsequent investigation determined that while a damaged hose had disabled the aircraft's primary landing gear extension system, an otherwise functional backup system was inoperative due to an accidentally deactivated circuit breaker.

On October 28, 2016, American Airlines Flight 383, a 767-300ER with 161 passengers and 9 crew members, aborted takeoff at Chicago O'Hare Airport following an uncontained failure of the right GE CF6-80C2 engine. The engine failure, which hurled fragments over a considerable distance, caused a fuel leak, resulting in a fire under the right wing. Fire and smoke entered the cabin. All passengers and crew evacuated the aircraft, with 20 passengers and one flight attendant sustaining minor injuries using the evacuation slides.

Other incidents

The airplane ran out of fuel in-flight and had to glide with both engines out for almost  to an emergency landing at Gimli, Manitoba, Canada. The pilots used the aircraft's ram air turbine to power the hydraulic systems for aerodynamic control. There were no fatalities and only minor injuries. This aircraft was nicknamed "Gimli Glider" after its landing site. The aircraft, registered C-GAUN, continued flying for Air Canada until its retirement in January 2008.

In January 2014, the U.S. Federal Aviation Administration issued a directive that ordered inspections of the elevators on more than 400 767s beginning in March 2014; the focus was on fasteners and other parts that can fail and cause the elevators to jam. The issue was first identified in 2000 and has been the subject of several Boeing service bulletins. The inspections and repairs are required to be completed within six years. The aircraft has also had multiple occurrences of "uncommanded escape slide inflation" during maintenance or operations, and during flight. In late 2015, the FAA issued a preliminary directive to address the issue.

Retirement and display

As new 767 variants roll off the assembly line, older series models have been retired and converted to cargo use, stored or scrapped. One complete aircraft, N102DA, is the first  to operate for Delta Air Lines and the twelfth example built. It was retired from airline service in February 2006 after being repainted back to its original 1982 Delta widget livery and given a farewell tour. It was then put on display at the Delta Flight Museum in the Delta corporate campus at the edge of Hartsfield–Jackson Atlanta International Airport. "The Spirit of Delta" is on public display as of 2022.

In 2013 a Brazilian entrepreneur purchased a 767-200 that had operated for the now-defunct carrier Transbrasil under the registration PT-TAC. The aircraft, which was sold at a bankruptcy auction, was placed on outdoor display in Taguatinga as part of a proposed commercial development. , however, the development has not come to fruition. The aircraft is devoid of engines or landing gear, has deteriorated due to weather exposure and acts of vandalism, but remains publicly accessible to view.

Specifications

See also

References

Notes

Citations

Bibliography

External links

 
 
 
 

 
767
Twinjets
1980s United States airliners
Aircraft first flown in 1981